Gretchena bolliana, the pecan bud moth or gray-flanked gretchena moth, is a moth of the family Tortricidae. It is found in the United States from South Carolina to Florida and west to Texas, Arizona and New Mexico.

The wingspan is about 17 mm. Adults are gray with blackish-brown patches on the forewings. There are probably five or six generations per year.

The larvae feed on the foliage of Carya illinoinensis. They also feed on young nuts in the spring and infest the shucks in the fall. The most serious damage occurs on pecan nursery stock, where the larvae feed on the terminal buds and unfolding foliage. The species overwinters as an adult. Pupation takes place in rolled-up leaves or infested buds and sometimes under bark scales. The larvae are about 12 mm long, creamy to dirty white when young and yellowish green with dark brown heads and necks when mature.

References

Moths described in 1896
Eucosmini